Commercial Drive is a roadway in the city of Vancouver in British Columbia, Canada that extends from Powell Street at its northern extremity, near the waterfront, south through the heart of the Grandview–Woodland neighbourhood to the Victoria Diversion near Trout Lake. The neighbourhood is so dominated by the businesses, cultural facilities, and residents along Commercial Drive that the area is far better known as "The Drive" than by the civic boundaries. The district is one of Vancouver's Business Improvement Areas (BIA).

The district is served by many different bus routes, as well as both the SkyTrain's Expo Line and Millennium Line at Commercial–Broadway Station.

Commercial Drive is a mixed residential-commercial area with a high proportion of ethnic and vegetarian restaurants, businesses, and public housing. The area has low property prices compared to the westside of Vancouver, yet has good city services and is a local transit hub. It has been the destination for generations of immigrants to Vancouver and has significant Italian, Asian, Latin America, East Indian, and African communities. As of the Canada 2001 Census, English is a minority language in Grandview-Woodland, though still the most common.

Commercial Drive has many local ethnic stores and community groups, Edwardian-style heritage buildings, European-style cafes, bars, and alternative shops and entertainment venues. As of late August 2007, there are 93 restaurants on Commercial Drive between Venables and Broadway, of which 19 are coffee bars.

It is home to an active street festival culture; notable annual events include the Vancouver Dyke March in August and the Parade of Lost Souls in October. It also plays host to Vancouver's only queer spoken word and musician performance night, Unsweetened (and Outspoken).

History
The Drive was originally a skid road for dragging logs to the harbour. It was named "Park Drive" but renamed "Commercial Drive" in 1911, possibly to avoid confusion with other Park Drives in Vancouver. Commercial Drive ends in the south at 16th Avenue,
the former end of Vancouver/start of City of South Vancouver, when it diverts to Victoria Diversion and eventually Victoria Drive. A limited light industrial Commercial Street carries on to 22nd Avenue, and around the Selkirk school there, until 54th Avenue as a residential street.

During the pre-World War One period, a number of speculators—including McSpadden and Odlum (both of whom have nearby streets named for them) -- attempted to turn the Grandview neighbourhood, centered on the Drive, into a real estate area comparable to the West End and the newly opened Shaughnessy Heights. The global financial collapse around 1913 put an end to their hopes.

After World War II many Italian immigrants settled in eastern Vancouver, and the northern part of Commercial Drive came to be known as "Little Italy". A sizable Portuguese community came to the area as well. During the 1960s, immigration from Asian countries began to dilute the European influence. A wave of Latino immigrants came in the 1980s as a result of the turmoil and civil wars in Central America. Many came from the Mercosur Republics of South America as well. Vietnamese nationals also immigrated here.

Throughout the 1980s, The Drive attracted a large counter-culture demographic, including political activists and punks. Around the turn of the millennium, local outlets of multi-national companies became the target of the anti-globalization movement and civil disobedience campaigns. SkyTrain opened into the neighbourhood with Broadway Station in December 1985. Increasing real estate prices near the downtown (e.g. Downtown Eastside) pushed many lower-income residents east toward Commercial Drive. Meanwhile, gentrification began to occur in the vicinity of the Drive, increasing housing prices, and driving housing development and new storefronts replacing old wood-frame stores.

In 2002, many restaurant owners were upset with the infamous "dancing police"; bylaw enforcement officers who ticketed establishments hosting any dancing to live music. In late 2004, Commercial Drive gained national notoriety when the media complained that several cafes there were openly selling marijuana. As of 2005, there are still very few large retail or restaurant chains on Commercial Drive. The Da Kine, an Amsterdam-style cafe, was raided by police and owner Carol Gwilt charged with trafficking. She was eventually sentenced to prison. The issue has publicised the city's lack of enforcement of Canadian drug laws, and demonstrated a commitment to its stated "Four Pillars" drug strategy.

In early summer 2005, Commercial Drive hosted its first car-free festival, in which 16 blocks were cleared of all vehicles and tens of thousands of people celebrated with walks, dancing, and food. The festival has since become an annual event, expanding to other parts of the city in 2008.

Today Commercial Drive is a multicultural and urban area.

Events

Car Free Day Festival 
Commercial Drive held the first Car Free Day celebration in 2005. Beginning in 2008, Car free days expanded to the West End, Main Street, Kitsilano, and North Vancouver (North Van). These celebrations aim to showcase the diversity and culture of local neighbourhoods, and increase foot traffic and sustainability within the city.

On Commercial Drive, Car Free day is held in early July, where the City blocks off Commercial Drive from Venables Street to Grandview Highway. The festival showcases local artisans, musicians, and activities. Local businesses are invited to move their production outside to the sidewalk and street for the day, creating outdoor spaces for eating and shopping. Since the festival's beginnings, it has become increasingly popular every year, bringing in more foot traffic as well as increasing numbers of local vendors and artisans.

Italian Days 
Italian day is a day of celebration of Commercial Drive's Italian roots and the Italian influences that have fostered the neighbourhood's growth over the years. Beginning in the early 1940s, when large numbers of Italians immigrated to the area, street festivals were often held by the community for general celebrations of Italian culture. The last festival before the modern revitalization of the celebration was held in 1982 when Italy won the World Cup for the first time since 1938.

The festival was rejuvenated in 2010 and has run every year since, bringing in businesses and foot-traffic. Italian Day is the largest one day cultural festival in Vancouver, bringing in an increasing attendance every year. The festival continues to celebrate Commercial Drive's Italian roots today, and does so by engaging local vendors, merchants, restaurant patios, stages with live music and theatre, street performances, activities and displays.

Major intersections

References

External links

 Commercial Drive Neighbourhood
 Commercial Drive Business Association
 Grandview Woodlands community
 Vancouver Dyke March
 Parade of Lost Souls
 Edible British Columbia Guided Tours of Commercial Drive

Shopping districts and streets in Canada
Streets in Vancouver